TRNA (carboxymethyluridine34-5-O)-methyltransferase (ALKBH8, ABH8, Trm9, tRNA methyltransferase 9) is an enzyme with systematic name S-adenosyl-L-methionine:tRNA (carboxymethyluridine34-5-O)-methyltransferase. This enzyme catalyses the following chemical reaction

 S-adenosyl-L-methionine + carboxymethyluridine34 in tRNA  S-adenosyl-L-homocysteine + 5-(2-methoxy-2-oxoethyl)uridine34 in tRNA

The enzyme catalyses the posttranslational modification of uridine residues at the wobble position 34 of the anticodon loop of tRNA.

References

External links 
 

EC 2.1.1